The Netherlands Football League Championship 1918–1919 was contested by 52 teams participating in five divisions. The national champion would be determined by a play-off featuring the winners of the eastern, northern, southern and two western football divisions of the Netherlands. AFC Ajax won this year's championship by beating Go Ahead, AFC, Be Quick 1887 and NAC.

New entrants
Eerste Klasse East:
Promoted from 2nd Division: ZAC (returning after six seasons of absence)
Eerste Klasse North:
Promoted from 2nd Division: MVV Alcides
Eerste Klasse South:
Promoted from 2nd Division: NOAD
Eerste Klasse West-B:
Promoted from 2nd Division: SV Fortuna Wormerveer

Divisions

Eerste Klasse East

Eerste Klasse North
Not all matches were played owing to poor ground conditions.
Therefore, rankings were based on games played and average points, which explains why some teams are ranked higher despite having less points.

Eerste Klasse South

Eerste Klasse West-A

Eerste Klasse West-B
The Eerste Klasse West-B would become Second Tier next season.

Championship play-off

References
RSSSF Netherlands Football League Championships 1898-1954
RSSSF Eerste Klasse Oost
RSSSF Eerste Klasse Noord
RSSSF Eerste Klasse Zuid
RSSSF Eerste Klasse West

Netherlands Football League Championship seasons
1918–19 in Dutch football
Netherlands